Zakutsky is a rural locality (a khutor) and the administrative center of Frunzenskoye Rural Settlement, Sredneakhtubinsky District, Volgograd Oblast, Russia. The population was 1,446 as of 2010. There are 27 streets.

Geography 
Zakutsky is located 18 km southwest of Srednyaya Akhtuba (the district's administrative centre) by road. Burkovsky is the nearest rural locality.

References 

Rural localities in Sredneakhtubinsky District